The Poway–Midland Railroad is a heritage railroad located in Old Poway Park in Poway, California.

The group "Poway–Midland Railroad Volunteers, Inc." operates the railroad and was founded in 1991 as a non-profit organization dedicated to the restoration, operation and maintenance of antique railroad equipment.

Excursions are run each weekend (the 1st and 3rd weekends of each month using a 1907 Baldwin 0-4-0 steam locomotive, except in January or February). The line has 11 total pieces of railroad equipment. This operation is unusual in that it has a track gauge of  narrow gauge.

The Poway–Midland Railroad is owned by the City of Poway and operated and maintained by the Poway–Midland Railroad Volunteers, Inc.

Preserved equipment

1907 Baldwin Steam Locomotive
1956 Fairmont Speeder
1906 San Francisco Cable Car

Historic timeline

May 1991 – Initial meeting
Nov 1991 – Incorporation of the PMRR Volunteers
Sep 1991 – Boxcar arrives on site
Apr 1993 – Trolley arrives on site
Jun 1993 – Track work completed
Jul 4 1993 – Old Poway Park dedication
Jul 4 1993 – First passenger carried behind speeder
Sep 1994 – First locomotive passenger run
Jul 1996 – Record passenger haul (2,500)
Jan 1997 – First woman fireman qualified
Oct 1997 – San Francisco Cable Car arrives
Jul 4 2002 – Turntable dedicated
Oct 2004 – Barn expansion dedicated
Oct 2009 – Depot dedicated (new ticket office, train shop, and museum)

Statistics

Total passengers: 425,336 (As of 1 November 2006)
Total volunteer hours: 74,492 (As of August 2006)
1,866 passengers July 4, 2005
1,829 passengers Train Song Fest 2006
1,732 passengers Christmas in the Park 2004
1,422 Rendezvous 2005
Operation Lifesaver program presented to 20,000+ viewers
40–50 Operations Lifesaver presentations annually
397 active members

See also

List of heritage railroads in the United States

References

External links
Official Poway–Midland Railroad website

Heritage railroads in California
Poway, California
3 ft 6 in gauge railways in the United States
Transportation in San Diego County, California
Tourist attractions in San Diego County, California